Pierre Antoine Henri Joseph Dalem (born 16 March 1912 in Liège; died 22 February 1993) was a Belgian footballer.

Career
A midfielder for Standard de Liège, Dalem played 162 matches and scored 5 goals in the Belgian First Division. He was a Belgian international from 1935 to 1939, and played 23 matches for the Diables Rouges.

Honours
 International from 1935 to 1939 (23 caps)
 Picked for the 1938 World Cup (did not play)
 Belgian runners-up in 1936 with Standard de Liège

References

External links 

Belgium international footballers
Standard Liège players
1912 births
Footballers from Liège
1993 deaths
Belgian footballers
1938 FIFA World Cup players
Association football midfielders